Sullorsuaq Strait (old spelling: Suvdlorssuaq) is a strait on the western coast of Greenland.

Geography 

The strait separates Nuussuaq Peninsula in the northeast from Qeqertarsuaq Island in the southwest. The strait waterway connects inner Disko Bay in the southeast with Baffin Bay in the northwest. Qeqertarsuatsiaq Island is located in the northeastern mouth of the strait, where it opens into Baffin Bay. At the southeastern end, the large Alluttoq Island is located in the outlet of the strait, at the confluence with Disko Bay.

History 
Archaeological excavations in Qilakitsoq on the northeastern shore revealed the existence of an ancient Arctic culture later named the Saqqaq culture, which is the archaeological designation of the earliest Palaeo-Eskimo culture of west and southeast part of Greenland. The natives inhabited the area of west-central Greenland between 2500 BCE and 800 BCE.

Settlement 
Saqqaq is the only settlement in the area, located in the southern part on the shores of Nuussuaq Peninsula. The former coal mining settlement of Qullissat was located on the coast of Disko Island. The entire coast is now uninhabited.

See also 
 Thule people

References

External links 

Disko Bay
Straits of Greenland